Caloptilia matsumurai is a moth of the family Gracillariidae. It is known from Honshū, Japan.

The wingspan is 11.7–13.2 mm. There are two forms, an aestival and an autumnal form, which are distinct in colour-pattern.

The larvae feed on Toxicodendron sylvestre and Toxicodendron trichocarpum. They mine the leaves of their host plant.

References

matsumurai
Moths of Japan
Moths described in 1982